The Wesleyan Methodist Church (also named the Wesleyan Methodist Connexion) was the majority Methodist movement in England following its split from the Church of England after the death of John Wesley and the appearance of parallel Methodist movements. The word Wesleyan in the title differentiated it from the Welsh Calvinistic Methodists (who were a majority of the Methodists in Wales) and from the Primitive Methodist movement, which separated from the Wesleyans in 1807. The Wesleyan Methodist Church followed the Wesleys in holding to an Arminian theology, in contrast to the Calvinism held by George Whitefield, by Selina Hastings (founder of the Countess of Huntingdon's Connexion), and by Howell Harris and Daniel Rowland, the pioneers of Welsh Methodism. Its Conference was also the legal successor to John Wesley as holder of the property of the original Methodist societies.

History

Although it was not his intention to establish a new Christian denomination, John Wesley's clandestine ordinations in 1784 made separation from the established Church of England virtually inevitable. Later in the same year, Wesley pronounced the first official Methodist Conference of 100 members, who were to govern the society of the Methodist movement after his death. John Wesley died in 1791. The estrangement between the Church of England and the Wesleyan Methodists was entrenched by the decision of the Methodist Conference of 1795 to permit the administration of the Lord's Supper in any chapel where both a majority of the trustees and a majority of the stewards and leaders allowed it. This permission was extended to the administration of baptism, burial and timing of chapel services, bringing Methodist chapels into competition with the local parish church. Consequently, known Methodists were often excluded from the Church of England, accelerating the trend for Methodism to become entirely separate from the established church.

For half a century after Wesley's death, the Methodist movement was characterised by a series of divisions, normally on matters of church government (e.g. Methodist New Connexion) and separate revivals (e.g. Primitive Methodism in Staffordshire, 1811, and the Bible Christian Church in south-west England, 1815). The original movement became known as the "Wesleyan Methodist Connexion" to distinguish itself from these groups. The 1891 conference endorsed the use of the term Church rather than Connexion, although it retained a Connexional polity.

In 1898, Robert Perks, MP for Louth, proposed the creation of the Wesleyan Methodist Twentieth Century Fund (also known as the 'One Million Guinea Fund') which aimed to raise one million guineas (£1.1s. or £1.05)  from  one million Methodists to build a Central London church to build a world centre of Wesleyan Methodism and to expand the mission of the Wesleyan Church at home and overseas.  On 8 November, 1898, the fund was officially launched at Wesley's Chapel in City Road, London. The fund had raised £1,073,682 by the time it closed in 1909, part of which was used to purchase the former Royal Aquarium site for the construction of the Methodist Central Hall, Westminster and to support construction and extension of other Wesleyan Methodist churches and Sunday schools around the UK and overseas.

Unification
The name "Wesleyan Methodist Church" remained in use until the Methodist Union of 1932, when the church re-united with the Primitive Methodist Church and the United Methodist Church to form the current Methodist Church of Great Britain.

Schools and education
John Wesley was convinced of the importance of education and, following the advice of his friend Dr. Philip Doddridge, opened schools at The Foundery in London, and at Newcastle and Kingswood. Following the upsurge in interest in education which accompanied the extension of franchise in 1832, the Methodist Conference commissioned William Atherton, Richard Treffry and Samuel Jackson to report on Methodist schools, coming to the conclusion that if the Church were to prosper the system of Sunday schools (3,339 in number at that time, with 59,277 teachers and 341,442 pupils) should be augmented by day-schools with teachers educated to high school level. The Rev. John Scott  proposed in 1843 that 700 new Methodist day-schools be established within seven years. Though a steady increase was achieved, that ambitious target could not be reached, in part limited by the number of suitably qualified teachers, mostly coming from the institution founded in Glasgow by David Stow. The outcome of the Wesleyan Education Report for 1844 was that planning began for permanent Wesleyan teacher-training college, resulting in the foundation of Westminster Training College in Horseferry Road, Westminster in 1851, with the Rev. Scott as its first principal.

Gallery

See also

List of presidents of the Methodist Conference
Manchester and Salford Wesleyan Methodist Mission
Wesleyan theology § Background

Notes

References

  This has a detailed history of the Church's early years.
 Turner, John Munsey (2002). John Wesley: The Evangelical Revival and the Rise of Methodism in England. Epworth Press. 

Former Methodist denominations